Vivienne Yeda Apopo is a Kenyan banker and business attorney. She is the current Director General of East African Development Bank (EADB). She assumed that position on 15 January 2009. She also currently serves as a member of the board of directors of the Central Bank of Kenya, since 14 March 2011.

Background
She was born Vivienne Yeda, in Kenya, during the second half of the 20th century.

Education
Vivienne Apopo holds the degree of Master of Business Administration (MBA), obtained from Edith Cowan University in Australia. She also holds the degree of Master of Laws (LLM), from the University of London.

Work experience
Prior to her employment at EADB, Ms. Apopo worked for the African Development Bank (AfDB), as the Resident Representative and Country Manager for Zambia. Prior to that, circa 2006, she served as "Director of Legal Affairs at the EADB".

In November 2020, she was appointed chairperson of the board of directors of Kenya Power and Lighting Company, the parastatal, public utility responsible for bulk purchase, distribution, marketing and retailing of electric energy in Kenya.

Recognition
In May 2014, Vivienne Yeda Apopo, was recognized for her work at EADB, when she was awarded the "African Banker of the Year Award", by the annual African Bank Award Ceremony, held in Kigali, Rwanda. The African Banker Awards are organised by African Banker magazine and BusinessinAfrica Events (BIAE). The awards are sponsored by the AfDB, the EADB,
Emerging Markets Payments, MasterCard International, and other leading industry organisations. In October 2014, she was named "Business Leader of the Year", by the Africa-America Institute, at an awards ceremony held in New York, in recognition of her contribution to "development banking, finance and business in Africa for over 20 years".

References

External links
Website of East African Development Bank
Website of African Development Bank

Living people
Alumni of the University of London
Edith Cowan University alumni
Kenyan bankers
20th-century Kenyan lawyers
Kenyan women lawyers
People from Nairobi
21st-century Kenyan businesswomen
21st-century Kenyan businesspeople
Year of birth missing (living people)